Virgil Earnest "Ernie" Irvan (born January 13, 1959), occasionally referred to as Swervin' Irvan, is an American former professional stock car racing driver. A retired NASCAR competitor, he is best remembered for his comeback after a serious head injury suffered from a crash during practice at Michigan in 1994 that left him with only a 10% chance of survival. Irvan has been inducted into numerous halls of fame and was named one of NASCAR's 50 Greatest Drivers in 1998. After a series of injuries in the late 1990s, he retired from racing in 1999.

Early career 
Irvan began his racing career driving karts in California in 1968 at the age of nine. He won the California Championship at the age of 15. In 1974, Irvan finished second in the country in his class at the national kart championship races. In 1975, Irvan moved up to stock cars at the age of 16 at Stockton 99 Speedway and was victorious in his first race on asphalt in a semi-main event. From then until 1981 Irvan raced every weekend at Madera and Stockton, California, winning numerous feature events. He missed his high school graduation ceremony to race at Riverside, California. During this time, he lost his best friend, Tim Williamson, in a racing accident at Riverside, several months before he was slated to test in Winston Cup.

Early Winston Cup 
In 1982, Irvan left California with $700 in his pocket and everything he owned loaded into his pickup truck and a homemade trailer, and he headed east to North Carolina. Worried about running out of money, Irvan stopped in Las Vegas and managed to leave with an additional $200.

Irvan supported himself in Charlotte, North Carolina by welding grandstand seats at Charlotte Motor Speedway, unloaded Ken Schrader's moving van, built racecars, and other odd jobs. During that time, he won nine races driving in the late model series at Concord Speedway. Driving a Firebird, Irvan won two races his first year and seven races the next year.

Irvan met car-builder Marc Reno and they became partners in their racing ventures. Before long, Irvan made his Winston Cup debut, on September 13, 1987 at Richmond Fairgrounds Raceway driving the No. 56 Chevrolet Monte Carlo. The car, built and prepared by Irvan and Reno, was sponsored by Dale Earnhardt Chevrolet. Irvan qualified 20th but was sidelined after 35 laps after the car's engine overheated. He finished 29th and won $860. Since he earned so little money, Irvan was spotted by long-time owner and driver D.K. Ulrich. Irvan made three starts in Ulrich's No. 6 car, finishing 15th at Martinsville, 22nd at North Wilkesboro Speedway, and 19th at Riverside. In October, Irvan drove the No. 56, again sponsored by Dale Earnhardt, in his first Winston Cup start at Charlotte, starting 36th, leading lap 128, and finishing eighth.

In 1988, Irvan made a bid for NASCAR Rookie of the Year, driving Ulrich's No. 2 Kroger Chevrolets and Pontiacs. Irvan competed in 25 of the 29 Winston Cup Series events, losing rookie-of-the-year honors to Ken Bouchard by three points (242-239) in the closest battle in Winston Cup history. Irvan's best finish of the year was 11th at Martinsville in September. He finished 26th in the final points standings with winnings for the year totaling $96,370. In 1989 Irvan started all 29 races in his first full year in the Winston Cup Series behind the wheel of Ulrich's U.S. Racing Pontiac. Irvan started 25th at Bristol in April and caught leader Mark Martin after 38 laps. Irvan went on to lead 56 laps before being sidelined in an accident on lap 167. Irvan's sixth-place finish at Martinsville in September gave him his best of four top-10 finishes for the year. Irvan finished 22nd in the final standings for the year with winnings totaling $155,239.

1990s success 
After sponsorship problems plagued Ulrich's team, Irvan left to race for Junie Donlavey, who had procured a sponsorship program with True Cure. True Cure failed to fulfill its financial obligations, and after three races, Irvan was told he could seek other opportunities. He moved over to Morgan-McClure Motorsports' (MMM) No. 4 Kodak-sponsored Oldsmobile, filling the vacancy left by Phil Parsons. After starting 30th in his first race for the new team (Atlanta in March), Irvan charged to the front and grabbed a third-place finish - the first Top 5 of his career. The next race, at Darlington Raceway, he became involved in controversy after being involved in an accident that nearly killed Neil Bonnett. Irvan then won his first Winston Cup pole position, at Bristol, in the spring. He won his first Winston Cup race, in the Busch 500 at Bristol, on August 25. Ernie wrapped up the season with three poles, one victory, six Top 5’s, and 13 Top 10’s; he also won $535,280 and finished ninth in the final point standings.

In February 1991, Irvan drove the Morgan-McClure Chevrolet to victory in the Daytona 500, stock car racing's most prestigious and then most lucrative race. Four years earlier, Irvan watched the 500 on a borrowed black and white TV while washing cars, one of several jobs he worked to support both his family and his struggling career. Irvan's next victory came later in the season at Watkins Glen International Raceway. The race was marred by the death of popular veteran J. D. McDuffie. Irvan ended the year with two victories, three second-place and four fourth-place finishes among his eleven top-five and nineteen top-10 finishes in 29 starts. He finished the year fifth in Winston Cup driver standings and won $1,079,017. Irvan also picked up his first Busch Grand National Series win in the AC-Delco 200 at Rockingham. During this time, Irvan came under more controversy due to his aggressive driving style, earning him the nickname "Swervin' Irvan" by his fellow competitors. Irvan apologized to his fellow drivers in a televised speech at the driver's meeting before the 1991 Diehard 500 after speaking with Darrell Waltrip and Richard Petty about improving his image.

Irvan's 1992 season was highlighted by three more victories - Sonoma in June; Daytona in July; and Talladega in July. He had three pole positions, nine Top 5’s, and 11 Top 10’s, $996,885 in winnings, and finished 11th in the final season points standing. He scored a pair of Busch Grand National wins at Watkins Glen and Talladega. He suffered a broken collarbone in an accident during a Busch Series race in March at Atlanta and twelve finishes of 24th or worse including seven he did not finish. On November 21, 1992, he married Kim Baker.

Moving to Robert Yates Racing
Irvan continued his tenure with Morgan-McClure in 1993, adding poles at Dover in June and Daytona in July and a victory at Talladega in May. In total, while driving for Morgan-McClure, Irvan obtained nine poles, seven wins, and 51 Top 10 finishes in 105 starts. 

On July 12, 1993, Irvan experienced a significant personal loss when his friend, Davey Allison, died from injuries sustained in a helicopter crash outside of Talladega. Robert Yates, Allison’s team owner, asked Irvan to replace him as the driver of the #28 Texaco-Havoline Ford at Robert Yates Racing. Morgan-McClure was unwilling to let Irvan out of his contract with the team, and a lawsuit ensued. 

After the night race at Bristol in August, Irvan was released from his duties driving the #4 and took over the #28 at the Southern 500 at Darlington the next week, where he started 10th and finished fifth. Irvan's first victory with RYR came in his fourth start with the team when he won at Martinsville later that same month. Irvan dedicated his victory that day to Allison and then followed that victory two weeks later with one at Charlotte in which he led all but six laps. Irvan scored five front-row positions (including two poles) and two victories in his nine races that season with RYR. Irvan was ranked ninth in driver standings at the time of his departure from Morgan-McClure, but he rose to sixth in the final standings.

At the 1994 Brickyard 400, Irvan was a factor and was leading with five laps to go when a tire puncture forced him to pit and lose a lap.

Head injury 
In August 1994, Irvan was a contender for the NASCAR Winston Cup Series Championship throughout the first 20 races of the season. Entering the GM Goodwrench Dealer 400 at Michigan on August 21, Irvan was in a close battle with Dale Earnhardt as the class of the field. They were matched on wins with three each, while Irvan led in top-five finishes and winnings and trailed Earnhardt by 27 points after having led the standings for most of the season. Although only running 20 out of 31 races in the 1994 season, Irvan was ahead of all drivers in miles led.

His contention for the championship ended during a Saturday early-morning practice session at Michigan. Irvan’s crew chief, Larry McReynolds, told him to come into the pits because he did not like the way the car was handling. Irvan intended to run one more lap before doing so, but just as he was entering the first turn, the car suffered a blown tire. The #28 careened into the concrete wall exiting turn two at 170 miles per hour (273 km/h). McReynolds, unaware that his driver had crashed, radioed to Irvan that the caution flag had just been displayed at the flag stand. One of the other members of the crew discovered that Irvan had crashed, and McReynolds and several others commandeered the pace car to take a ride over to the scene. Officials on the scene, however, refused to let them near the wreck due to the seriousness of the situation.

Track medical staff tended to Irvan, with a local trauma doctor offering assistance by performing an emergency tracheotomy to help him breathe. Irvan was then airlifted to Saint Joseph’s Hospital in nearby Ann Arbor, Michigan, where he was diagnosed with a basilar skull fracture and lung injuries and given only a 10% chance of surviving the night. Irvan clung to life for the first two days. By early September, Irvan was listed in "fair" condition and was removed from ventilator support. A few weeks later, he was deemed well enough to be transferred to the Charlotte Institute of Rehabilitation in Charlotte. A few weeks following the transfer, Irvan appeared and addressed the fans at Charlotte Motor Speedway prior to the start of the Mello Yello 500.

Less than two months later, at the gala NASCAR Awards Banquet in New York, Irvan walked on stage at the Waldorf-Astoria Hotel's Grand Ballroom to receive the True Value Hard Charger Award. Despite missing the final 11 races at the end of the season, Irvan still ranked among the top five for the most laps led. In addition, Irvan tied Geoff Bodine for the most poles won during the season.

Recovery and comeback 

Throughout the first eight months of 1995, Irvan remained focused on returning to Winston Cup racing and did broadcast work for TNN while recovering. He went through rehabilitation and strength training to regain his physical strength. On September 16, NASCAR cleared Irvan for competition. His first attempt at qualifying for a race since his absence, the NASCAR Craftsman Truck Series race at Martinsville in late September, ended when the field was set by points standings after qualifying was rained-out. 

The following weekend's events at North Wilkesboro Speedway would see Irvan qualify on the outside pole for the Truck Series event. Six laps after the green flag was dropped, Irvan passed pole sitter Mike Skinner for the lead. Irvan led another 23 laps before mechanical problems sidelined him. 

That, however, was not the story of the weekend. For the first time since his accident at Michigan, Irvan entered a Winston Cup race. Driving in the #88 Texaco Havoline Ford as teammate to Dale Jarrett, who had taken over for Irvan in the #28, Irvan made the race; starting in seventh position, he advanced to third by lap 47 and took the lead on lap 125. He held the lead for 31 laps and finished on the lead lap in sixth position. Irvan started at Phoenix International Raceway a few weeks later but could not stay in the race due to engine failure, but he did lead the most laps despite having to start last in the field due to a crash in practice. He started the season finale at Atlanta Motor Speedway and finished seventh.

For the 1996 season, Irvan moved back into the #28 Ford as Jarrett, his substitute, became his full-time teammate in the #88. 

Irvan's comeback season started well when he qualified on the front row for the season opening Daytona 500 beside Dale Earnhardt. During Speedweeks, Irvan captured a victory in the 125-mile qualifying race for the Daytona 500. As the season progressed, Irvan won the pole position for the spring race at Talladega, then scored victories at New Hampshire and Richmond. On his way to a top-10 finish in the Winston Cup points standings, he collected 12 top-five and 16 top-10 finishes, led 15 of the 31 events, and earned a career-best $1,670,113.

Irvan returned for the 1997 season and notched his 15th career win. The victory came in June at Michigan Speedway, the track that nearly claimed his life three years earlier. Irvan ran up five top-five finishes, 13 top-10s and two pole positions and earned $1,614,281. This would be also be Ernie Irvan's final season with Robert Yates. Irvan would be involved in an altercation in Charlotte during Easter weekend where he refused to dance with a female patron and escalated into a fight in the parking lot. In May, Irvan arrived late to a reception dinner thanking Texaco for 10 years of support. At the end of the year, Irvan was let go by Robert Yates Racing and replaced by rookie driver Kenny Irwin, Jr.

Last years in NASCAR and retirement 

In 1998, Irvan joined MB2 Motorsports to drive the No. 36 Skittles Pontiac. During the year he scored 11 top-10 finishes with three pole positions despite missing the final three races while recovering from injuries suffered at Talladega in October. Irvan finished the season 19th in the Winston Cup points standings, earning $1,476,141. His highlight of 1998 was the birth of his son, Jared, on February 9.

Irvan continued driving the No. 36 for MB2 in 1999, but with a different sponsor. M&M Mars (parent corporation of Skittles) decided to emblazon the popular M&Ms characters on the car.

On August 20, exactly five years after his near fatal accident there, Irvan crashed at Michigan while driving his own No. 84 Irvan-Simo Federated Auto Parts Pontiac in a practice session for the Busch Series race. Irvan was again airlifted from the track and was diagnosed with a mild head injury and a bruised lung as a result of the accident.

Two weeks later, on September 3, 1999, surrounded by his wife and two children, Irvan announced his retirement from driving at a tearful press conference in Darlington, South Carolina. While he would fully recover before the end of the 1999 season, the reasoning for his retirement was to prevent future incidents while he had a family to support.

Irvan finished his Winston Cup career as a driver with 15 victories, 22 poles, 68 top-fives, 124 top-10s and over 11 million dollars in career earnings.

After retirement from NASCAR
Just before his final years in NASCAR, Irvan briefly co-owned a NASCAR Truck Series team in partnership with Mark Simo and No Fear. The team's first driver was Joe Ruttman, who finished second in points in 1995. The team's next and most famous driver was sports-car racer Boris Said, who drove the #44 Irvan-Simo Racing truck sponsored by Federated Auto Parts. Said's only win was at Sonoma in 1998. The team also fielded a part-time Cup effort with Said in 1999, where Said qualified 2nd at Watkins Glen, led 9 laps, but retired with a blown engine.

Afterwards, Irvan announced he was planning to start a Cup team with Mark Simo with sponsorship from Federated Auto Parts, but it never materialized.

After a fire in his house destroyed all of his trophies in March 2000, NASCAR presented Irvan with replicas of the lost trophies.

As of 2007, he is the crew chief on his son Jared's quarter midget. In 2012, Jared won the Quarter Midget Racing Championship and is leading the USAC Ignite Midget Eastern Region championship, and a late model car has been ordered for Jared's planned move into late models. Jared also plans to run the 2015 NASCAR K&N Pro Series East season.

Irvan attended five NASCAR races in 2006, promoting a foundation that he formed called Race2safety as an advocate for head-injury awareness. The foundation promotes awareness and prevention of head injuries, especially among children.

Irvan attended the 50th annual Daytona 500 and was one of the 24 grand marshals giving the command to start the engines.

The Irvan family used to live in Wadmalaw Island, South Carolina, near Charleston, where they owned El Cardenal Farm and organized the Equestrian Club of Charleston. According to Irvan on Dale Earnhardt Jr.'s Dirty Mo Media podcast in September 2020, he and his wife currently live in Ocala, Florida.

Irvan and his family were featured on NASCAR Now on its "Wayback Wednesday" segment. It featured him and his wife on their ranch in South Carolina.

Irvan was (and still is) recognized on Sirius Satellite Radio's "The Howard Stern Show" by Ronnie "the Limo Driver" Mund, who mentioned Irvan as his favorite NASCAR driver; the drop of Mund saying Irvan's name is still played on the show today and has been featured in multiple prank calls by Sal "the Stock Broker" Governale and Richard "Supertwink" Christy.

In June 2016, Irvan was inducted into the Sonoma Raceway Wall of Fame. He currently helps out his son Jared in his racing career and spends time with his family on their farm.

Career highlights

Winston Cup victories (15 career wins)
1997 (One win) Miller 400 (Michigan)
1996 (Two wins) Jiffy Lube 300 (Loudon), Miller 400 (Richmond)
1994 (Three wins) Pontiac Excitement 400 (Richmond), Purolator 500 (Atlanta), Save Mart Supermarkets 300 (Sonoma)
1993 (Three wins) Winston 500 (Talladega), Goody's 500 (Martinsville), Mello Yello 500 (Charlotte)
1992 (Three wins) Save Mart 300K (Sonoma), Pepsi 400 (Daytona), DieHard 500 (Talladega)
1991 (Two wins) Daytona 500 (Daytona), Budweiser At The Glen (Watkins Glen)
1990 (One win) Busch 500 (Bristol)

Busch Series victories (three career wins) 
1992 (Two wins) Fay's 150 (Watkins Glen), Fram Filter 500K (Talladega)
1991 (One win) AC-Delco 200 (Rockingham)

Motorsports career results

NASCAR
(key) (Bold – Pole position awarded by qualifying time. Italics – Pole position earned by points standings or practice time. * – Most laps led.)

Winston Cup Series

Daytona 500

Busch Series

Craftsman Truck Series

ARCA Permatex SuperCar Series
(key) (Bold – Pole position awarded by qualifying time. Italics – Pole position earned by points standings or practice time. * – Most laps led.)

References

External links

Lawsuit news story
Lawsuit op-ed column

1959 births
Living people
NASCAR drivers
Sportspeople from Salinas, California
Racing drivers from California
American Speed Association drivers
ARCA Menards Series drivers
Robert Yates Racing drivers